Hjaltalín is an Icelandic indie rock band that has published four studio albums as of 2020. Their second record, Terminal, was chosen as the album of the year at the 2010 Icelandic Music Awards. They have also played throughout Europe, most notably at Roskilde and Latitude festivals (2009) and at Sziget Festival (2010).

History
Hjaltalín was formed in Reykjavík, Iceland in 2004.
Between January and October 2007, they recorded their first album, Sleepdrunk Seasons, in Reykjavík and Amsterdam. It was released on the Icelandic label Kimi Records first, and a European release followed in 2009.
The band had a major hit with a cover of Paul Oscar's "Þú komst við hjartað í mér" in 2008, which proved to be the most popular song in Iceland that year.
Hjaltalín's second album, Terminal, won an award at the 2010 Icelandic Music Awards. They have since issued two more studio albums: 2014's Enter 4 and the self-titled Hjaltalín in 2020. They have also published a soundtrack to the film Days of Gray (2014) and a live recording with the Iceland Symphony Orchestra, Alpanon, in 2010.

Individual projects
Some members of the band have released solo work. Vocalist Sigríður Thorlacius published the album Jólakveðja in 2013. Högni Egilsson's Two Trains came out in 2017, and the musician has also scored a number of theatre, film, and television productions, including the 2021 Netflix series Katla. Violinist Viktor Orri Árnason released the album Eilífur in 2021.

Band members

Current
 Axel Haraldsson - drums
 Guðmundur Óskar Guðmundsson - bass
 Hjörtur Ingvi Jóhannsson - piano, keyboards
 Högni Egilsson - vocals, guitar
 Sigríður Thorlacius - vocals
 Viktor Orri Árnason - violin

Former
 Grímur Helgason - clarinet
 Rebekka Bryndís Björnsdóttir - bassoon, percussion

Discography

Albums
 Sleepdrunk Seasons (2007)
 Terminal (2009)
 Alpanon (Live recording with the Iceland Symphony Orchestra – 2010)
 Enter 4 (2012)
 Days of Gray (Original Motion Picture Soundtrack) (2014)
 Hjaltalín (2020)

Singles
 "Traffic Music" (2007)
 "Þú komst við hjartað í mér" (2008)
 "Sjómannavalsinn" (2009)
 "Stay By You" (2009)
 "Suitcase Man" (2009)
 "Engill alheimsins" (2013)
 "Halo" (2013)
 "We Will Live for Ages" (2015)
 "Baronesse" (2019)
 "Love from 99" (2019)

Gallery

References

External links

 

Icelandic indie rock groups
Musical groups from Reykjavík